Éjszakai országút is the third album by the Hungarian rock
band Omega, released in 1970. It was the last band album with keyboardist/vocalist Gábor Presser and drummer József Laux, who departed and formed Locomotiv GT.

Track listing

Line-up/Musicians
 János Kóbor – lead vocals
 Gábor Presser – organ, piano, vibraphone, backing vocals, lead vocal (A2, A4)
 Laszlo Benkő – flute, trumpet, piano, backing vocal
 Tamas Mihály – bass guitar, cello, backing vocals
 György Molnár – guitar
 József Laux – drums, percussion

References
 Éjszakai országút at Discogs

1970 albums
Omega (band) albums
Hungarian-language albums
Qualiton Records albums